The 1991 Bliss Cup was a men's tennis tournament held in Guarujá in Brazil and played on hardcourt. It was part of the 1991 ATP Tour. It was the only edition of the tournament and took place from 21 October through 28 October 1991. Javier Frana won the singles title.

Finals

Singles

 Javier Frana defeated  Markus Zoecke 2–6, 7–6(7–1), 6–3
 It was Frana's 2nd title of the year and the 4th of his career.

Doubles

 Jacco Eltingh /  Paul Haarhuis defeated  Bret Garnett /  Todd Nelson 6–3, 7–5
 It was Eltingh's 4th title of the year and the 4th of his career. It was Haarhuis' 3rd title of the year and the 4th of his career.

References

Bliss Cup
Guarujá Open